The midland water snake (Nerodia sipedon pleuralis), a subspecies of the northern water snake (Nerodia sipedon), is a nonvenomous natricine snake, which is endemic to North America.

Geographic range
It is found in the central and southern United States, more specifically, in Alabama, northern Arkansas, northwestern Georgia, southern Illinois, southern Indiana, western Kentucky, southeastern Louisiana, Mississippi, southern Missouri, southeastern Oklahoma, northwestern South Carolina, and western and southeastern Tennessee.

Description
Anteriorly, it has a pattern of dark crossbands on a light ground color. Posteriorly, the crossbands are replaced by three rows of alternating squarish blotches. The light spaces between the crossbands or blotches are wider than the dark markings. On the belly, the crescent-shaped markings on the ventrals tend to form two stripe-like series.

The maximum recorded total length for this subspecies is 131 cm (51.5 inches). However, most adults are 56–102 cm (22-40 inches) in total length.

Habitat
This snake lives in wet habitats such as marshes, ponds, streams, and swales. In the Southern United States, it follows river valleys to the Gulf Coast.

Diet
Nerodia sipedon pleuralis has a diet that is similar to other species of water snakes.  Juvenile and small adults consume a variety of prey such as fishes, frogs, and salamanders.  Adults consume primarily fishes.

References

Further reading
Cope, E.D. (1892). A Critical Review of the Characters and Variations of the Snakes of North America. Proc. U.S. Nat. Mus. 14: 589-694. (Natrix fasciata pleuralis, p. 672.)
Wright, A.H. and A.A. Wright. (1957). Handbook of Snakes of the United States and Canada. Comstock. Ithaca and London. 1,105 pp. (in 2 volumes) (Natrix sipedon pleuralis, pp. 537–541, Figure 160. + Map 42. on p. 512.)

sipedon pleuralis
Endemic fauna of the United States
Reptiles of the United States
Taxa named by Edward Drinker Cope
Fauna of the Southeastern United States